Silver–Calcium alloy batteries are a type of lead–acid battery with grids made from lead–calcium–silver alloy, instead of the traditional lead–antimony alloy or newer lead–calcium alloy. They stand out for its resistance to corrosion and the destructive effects of high temperatures. The result of this improvement is manifested in increased battery life and maintaining a high starting power over time.

Technological information 
Technological improvements of this new alloy include increased corrosion resistance, greater resistance to high temperatures, longer shelf life, longer life of use (mean 6 years), minimal self-discharge and as having the highest breakout.

Disadvantages 
Silver calcium batteries generally require more charging voltage (14.4 to 14.8 V) and deteriorate rapidly in vehicles which do not provide the required voltage range. (Alternators) which never reach required voltage range will cause rapid sulfation due to battery never being charged fully. As a general rule, silver-calcium batteries should not be installed to vehicles or systems which are not specifically designed for silver calcium battery chemistry. This also may occur with static chargers, some of which fail to charge these batteries.

See also 
 List of battery types
 Rechargeable battery
 Lead–acid battery
 VRLA battery
 Automotive battery

References

External links 
 Comparison of Antimonial and Calcium Batteries
 What are Silver/Calcium Batteries?
 Laptop Battery

Battery types